Patent monetization refers to the generation of revenue or the attempt to generate revenue by a person or company by selling or licensing the patents it owns. According to a 2006 survey of patent owners at the European Patent Office, about half of small and medium-sized enterprises (SMEs) take patents for monetary reasons.

Some of these owners try to make money from patents on inventions they develop, manufacture or market. Others attempt to generate revenue by buying and enforcing patents against one or more alleged infringers in a manner considered by the target or observers as unduly aggressive or opportunistic, often with no intention to further develop, manufacture or market the patented invention. The latter group is pejoratively called patent trolls by their critics.

History
Texas Instruments is believed to be the first company to monetize in the 1990s its portfolio of patents (more than 38,000 in total) when the company was losing market share to competitors. 

After the Texas Instruments example, IBM was another company who used the same technique in the 1990s to monetize its own patents to make more than $1 billion annually in revenue.

Microsoft uses its patents to make deals with the major Android vendors, which amount to more than 70% of Android's market share.

Eastman Kodak is an example of a struggling company which use its patents portfolio to make additional revenue. For example, it is said that Kodaks' licensing programs have generated more than $3 billion in revenue since 2004.

Nokia generated €500 million from patents in 2013.

Guangdong Deal 
Eleven high-tech companies in China's Guangzhou Development District, through a sales-and-licensing back arrangement, collectively securitized their patents in exchange for a proceed of CN¥300 million on July 31, 2019, which was reportedly the first patent securitization deal in China.

Ant Group 
Alibaba Group made an in-kind investment by contributing IPs appraised at CN¥12 billion to Ant Group in exchange for one-third shareholding.

The IPs contributed through in-kind investment account to 90% of Ant Group’s IPs, including 26,279 patents applied or granted, 8,569 trademarks, 677 copyrights, 3,927 domain names, and 369 design patents and trade secrets in 40 countries and regions at home and abroad, covering the technological areas of artificial intelligence, risk control, security, and blockchain. 

In November 2020 before Ant Groups’ IPO was put on hold, its estimated market capitalization was once about CN¥2.1 trillion, i.e., the CN¥12 billion becoming CN¥700 billion market value (1/3 of the shareholding), about 50 times investment return generated from Alibaba’s IP Monetization.

See also
 Background, foreground, sideground and postground intellectual property
 Patent holding company
 Patent privateer
 Patent valuation
 Intellectual property in China

References

Patent law